Stębark  (1945-46 Sztymbark) is a village in the administrative district of Gmina Grunwald, within Ostróda County, Warmian-Masurian Voivodeship, in northern Poland. The village is chiefly known for two historic battles which took place there: the 1410 Battle of Grunwald and the (Second) Battle of Tannenberg in World War I.

Geography
It is situated on the western edge of the historic Masuria region, southeast of the Dylewska Góra range. The village has a population of 630. From 1975 to 1998 it belonged to Olsztyn Voivodeship.

History
The settlement was first mentioned as Tannenberge about 1335, when the area was part of the State of the Teutonic Order. The Old Polish name Sztambark was already documented in 1426.

On 15 July 1410 a united army of the Kingdom of Poland and the Grand Duchy of Lithuania led by King Władysław II Jagiełło and Grand Duke Vytautas, with additional mercenary troops from Bohemia, defeated the Teutonic Knights under Grand Master Ulrich von Jungingen in the Battle of Grunwald. The site of the cavalry battle, one of the largest in the whole Middle Ages, was actually the heath between the villages of Tannenberg and neighboring Grünfelde (now, Grunwald), mentioned by King Władysław as "loco conflictus nostri ... dicto Grunenvelt". Adopted as Grunwald by the Polish chronicler Jan Długosz (1415–1480), the battle was called Bitwa pod Grunwaldem in Polish, while German historiography named it Schlacht bei Tannenberg, after the deployment area of the Teutonic troops.

Upon the 1411 Peace of Thorn, the Teutonic Knights had a lady chapel erected at the site, where Ulrich von Jungingen was killed in the battle. In 1454, King Casimir IV Jagiellon incorporated the region to the Kingdom of Poland upon the request of the anti-Teutonic Prussian Confederation. After the subsequent Thirteen Years' War (1454–1466), it became a part of Poland as a fief held by the Teutonic Knights until 1525, and by secular Ducal Prussia afterwards, following the Prussian Homage. Ravaged by Lipka and Crimean Tatar forces during the Deluge of the Second Northern War in 1656, Stębark, along with Masuria, was annexed by the Kingdom of Prussia in the 1772 First Partition of Poland and incorporated into the Province of East Prussia.

In 1914 during World War I the German Army under the command of General Paul von Hindenburg won an important victory over the Russian Imperial forces invading East Prussia in the Battle of Tannenberg. The combat lasted from 26 to 30 August and actually included a wide range of battlegrounds centered on Olsztynek, then known as Hohenstein. It was, however, named after nearby Tannenberg by the victorious Germans at Hindenburg's request, for propaganda purposes and to cast it as a kind of revenge for the medieval defeat. In 1934 von Hindenburg's funeral occurred there. In World War II, the Tannenberg myth lent the name to the German Operation Tannenberg extermination actions directed at the Polish people, while the Battle of Tannenberg Line refers to an Eastern Front campaign which took place in Estonia.

After the German defeat in 1945, Stębark with Masuria became again part of Poland according to the Potsdam Agreement, although with a Soviet-installed communist regime, which stayed in power until the 1980s. The remaining German population was expelled, also in accordance with the Potsdam Agreement.

Sights
The Grunwald Battlefield is located nearby.

References

Villages in Ostróda County